Ananke is a retrograde irregular moon of Jupiter. It was discovered by Seth Barnes Nicholson at Mount Wilson Observatory in 1951 and is named after the Greek mythological Ananke, the personification of necessity, and the mother of the Moirai (Fates) by Zeus. The adjectival form of the name is Anankean.

It was sometimes called "Adrastea" between 1955 and 1975 (Adrastea is now the name of another satellite of Jupiter).

Ananke gives its name to the Ananke group, retrograde irregular moons which orbit Jupiter between 19.3 and 22.7 Gm, at inclinations of roughly 150°.

Orbit

Ananke orbits Jupiter on a high-eccentricity and high-inclination retrograde orbit. Fifteen irregular satellites orbiting Jupiter have been discovered since 2000 following similar orbits. The orbital elements are as of January 2000. They are continuously changing due to solar and planetary perturbations. The diagram illustrates Ananke's orbit in relation to other retrograde irregular satellites of Jupiter. The eccentricity of selected orbits is represented by the yellow segments (extending from the pericentre to the apocentre). The outermost regular satellite Callisto is located for reference.

Given these orbital elements and the physical characteristics known so far,  Ananke is thought to be the largest remnant of an original break-up, forming the Ananke group.

Physical characteristics

In the visible spectrum, Ananke appears neutral to light-red (colour indices B-V=0.90 V-R=0.38).

The infrared spectrum is similar to P-type asteroids but with a possible indication of water.

See also

 Irregular satellites

References

Sources

 Ephemeris IAU-MPC NSES

External links
Ananke Profile by NASA's Solar System Exploration
David Jewitt pages
Scott Sheppard pages

Ananke group
Moons of Jupiter
Irregular satellites
19510928
Discoveries by Seth B. Nicholson
Moons with a retrograde orbit